Simon Dawes was a rock band originally from Malibu, California.  The band was signed with Record Collection and released their debut full-length, Carnivore, in September 2006.  They had previously released two EPs. Blake Mills (guitar) left the band shortly after Carnivores release. The band's current incarnation is Dawes.

Background
The band was composed of four friends.  Two of its founding members, Taylor Goldsmith (vocals, guitar, keys, lyrics) and Blake Mills (vocals, guitar, and lyrics), began playing music together in junior high at Malibu High School, and their middle names formed the band name. Dawes is the middle name of Taylor Goldsmith and Simon is the middle name of Blake Mills. The other two founding members were Grant Powell (bass) and Dylan Grombacher (drums).  Their sound evolved and they became Simon Dawes with replacements Wylie Gelber (bass) and Stuart Johnson (drums). Stuart Johnson was later replaced by Taylor's brother, Griffin Goldsmith.

Along with playing many California shows, Simon Dawes toured with The Walkmen, Maroon 5, Band of Horses, Eisley, Wolfmother and Incubus, among other artists.

Discography

Albums
Carnivore – (September 12, 2006) Record Collection

EPs
Simon Dawes
What No One Hears – (October 11, 2005) Record Collection
Final Noise E.P. – (2006) iTunes exclusive

(Note: the Final Noise E.P. included tracks from a few artists on Eisley's Final Noise tour)

References

External links
 Simon Dawes at MySpace
 Band blog

Alternative rock groups from California
Indie rock musical groups from California
Record Collection artists